Stargach is a border mountain, situated between Bulgaria and Greece. It is located east of the Slavyanka Mountain, west of the Beslen hill, south of the Pirin Mountains and north of the Kato Novrokopi valley.

With its round outlines, Stargach is a reduced copy of the Slavyanka Mountain. Its highest peak is situated in Greek territory – Stargach or Kulata peak (1,270 m.). The highest peak in Bulgarian territory is Asenov peak (1,218 m.)

Stargach is a horst, formed of metamorphic rocks – marble, gneiss and mica. There are also granite and quartz at some places.

The flora of Stargach consists of mainly of bushes and low forests: South European flowering ash (Fraxinus ornus), common hazel (Corylus avellana), common juniper (Juniperus communis), lilac (Syringa spp.), etc. At the highest areas of the mountain grow forests of common beech (Fagus sylvatica).

Common animal species are wildcat, wild boar, European hare, etc.

Nearby villages are Ilinden and Nova Lovcha.

Mountains of Bulgaria
Mountains of Greece
Landforms of Blagoevgrad Province
Bulgaria–Greece border
International mountains of Europe
Rhodope mountain range
Horsts (geology)